José Rubén Escajeda Jiménez (born 11 March 1960) is a Mexican politician affiliated with the PRI. He served as Deputy of the LXII Legislature of the Mexican Congress representing Durango.

Previously, he served as municipal president of San Juan del Río from 1992 to 1995 and a member of the Congress of Durango from 1995 to 1998.

References

1960 births
Living people
Politicians from Durango
Institutional Revolutionary Party politicians
21st-century Mexican politicians
Members of the Congress of Durango
20th-century Mexican politicians
Municipal presidents in Durango
Deputies of the LXII Legislature of Mexico
Members of the Chamber of Deputies (Mexico) for Durango